Annadale is a historic home located at North Vernon, Jennings County, Indiana.  It was built about 1910, and is a two-story, Bungalow / American Craftsman style frame dwelling. It has a low pitched, clay tile hipped roof and sits on a full basement.  It features a two-story front porch, large chimney, and porte cochere.  Also on the property are the contributing original garage (converted to living and office space) and privy.

It was listed on the National Register of Historic Places in 2007.

References

Houses on the National Register of Historic Places in Indiana
Houses completed in 1910
Buildings and structures in Jennings County, Indiana
National Register of Historic Places in Jennings County, Indiana